Terror was a  of the Spanish Navy that fought at San Juan, Puerto Rico during the Spanish–American War. Constructed in the United Kingdom, the ship entered service in 1896 and was significantly damaged at the Second Battle of San Juan in 1898. In 1920, the destroyer was converted to a minelayer and discarded in 1924.

Technical characteristics
Terror was built in the United Kingdom by Thomson, (which would rename itself Clydebank Engineering & Shipbuilding Co. the following year). Her keel was laid on 9 February 1896, she was launched on 28 August 1896, and she was completed on 20 November 1896. She had three funnels. In the parlance of the day, she was a "torpedo boat destroyer", designed to protect larger ships against torpedo boat attack, but also carrying torpedoes with which to attack larger ships herself.

Operational history

As tensions between Spain and the United States grew in early 1898, Terror was part of the Spanish Navy's 1st Squadron, commanded by Vice Admiral Pascual Cervera y Topete. The squadron was ordered to concentrate at São Vicente in Portugal's Cape Verde Islands. The ships had experienced mechanical problems and burned an excessive amount of coal during the voyage.

The Spanish–American War began while Terror was at São Vicente. Ordered by neutral Portugal in accordance with international law to leave São Vicente within 24 hours of the declaration of war, Terror and the rest of Cervera's squadron departed on 29 April 1898, bound for San Juan, Puerto Rico. Because of continuing engine trouble and low coal supplies, Terror and her fellow destroyers were towed part of the way. Cervera's ships reached French-owned Martinique in the Lesser Antilles on 10 May 1898.

While the other ships loitered in international waters, Furor and Terror went into Fort-de-France to ask for coal. France was neutral and would not supply coal. Moreover, the American auxiliary cruiser  had just left port, and French officials announced that in accordance with international law and France's neutrality, the destroyers, as belligerents, could not leave port until 48 hours after Harvard had left, i.e., on 13 May 1898. Terror had become immobilized with engine problems, so the destroyer flotilla commander, Captain Fernando Villaamil, took Furor out in the harbor on 12 May 1898 under the ruse of testing her engines, then successfully made a dash out into international waters 24 hours early. Cervera's squadron steamed on, leaving Terror behind. Terror soon got her engines running and was released by the French authorities. She made for San Juan, Puerto Rico, arriving there on 17 May 1898.

Little happened for a month, until the United States Navy established a permanent blockade of San Juan on 18 June 1898. The auxiliary cruiser  moved in, resulting in a short, running gun battle, from which the Spanish quickly broke away. She hit Terror repeatedly, killing two men (the only casualties either side suffered in the action) and putting a hole in the destroyer's side. Severely damaged, Terror retreated and had to be beached.

Terror spent the rest of the war under repair at San Juan. Repairs were completed on 14 September 1898, a month after the war ended, and she returned to Spain.

Around 1920, Terror was equipped for minelaying. She was scrapped in 1924.

References
 Chesneau, Roger, and Eugene M. Kolesnik, Eds. Conway's All The World's Fighting Ships 1860–1905. New York City: Mayflower Books Inc., 1979. .
 Gray, Randal, Ed. Conway's All The World's Fighting Ships 1906–1921. Annapolis, Maryland: Naval Institute Press, 1985. .
 Nofi, Albert A. The Spanish–American War, 1898. Conshohocken, Pennsylvania: Combined Books, Inc., 1996. .

External links
 The Spanish–American War Centennial Website: Torpedo-Boat Destroyers Furor, Pluton, and Terror
 Department of the Navy: Naval Historical Center: Online Library of Selected Images: Spanish Navy Ships: Terror (Destroyer, 1896–1925)

 

Furor-class destroyers
Ships built on the River Clyde
1896 ships
Spanish–American War destroyers of Spain
Mine warfare vessels of the Spanish Navy